Georgia State Route 15 Connector may refer to:

 Georgia State Route 15 Connector (Baldwin): a former connector route of State Route 15 that existed in Baldwin
 Georgia State Route 15 Connector (Clarkesville): a former connector route of State Route 15 that existed in Clarkesville
 Georgia State Route 15 Connector (Cornelia 1965–1972): a former connector route of State Route 15 that existed in Cornelia
 Georgia State Route 15 Connector (Cornelia): a connector route of State Route 15 that exists in Cornelia
 Georgia State Route 15 Connector (Sparta): a former connector route of State Route 15 that existed in Sparta

015 Connector